Mucho + (Much more) is a B-Sides album by Argentine rock group Babasónicos with the songs who didn't make the final cut for Mucho. It was released on CD in 2009. The first single for the album is "Formidable".

Track listing
"Formidable" (Formidable)
"Todo dicho" (All Said)
"Para lelos" (For Dumbs)
"Mientras tanto" (Meanwhile)
"Letra chica" (Small Letter)
"El pozo" (The Well)
"Parece" (It Seems)
"Pijamas (remix)" (Pijamas, remix)
"Nosotros (mezcla 2)" (Us, 2nd version)
"Yo anuncio (mezcla 2)" (I Announce, 2nd version)

Singles
"Formidable"
"Todo dicho"

References

Babasónicos albums
2009 compilation albums
B-side compilation albums